Arctic Thunder is the 16th studio album by Norwegian band Darkthrone. It was released 14 October 2016 by Peaceville Records. It was recorded from August to December 2015 at Necrohell II Studios. The first single from the album was "Tundra Leech".

The album was named after a Norwegian metal band, active from 1985 to 1989. Darkthrone received permission to use the name. The album's music is a combination of the band's 90's black metal sound with the classic heavy metal influence of their previous record.

Track listing

Personnel
Darkthrone
 Nocturno Culto – vocals, electric guitar, bass guitar on tracks 2, 4, 6 and 7
 Fenriz – drums, additional electric guitar, bass guitar on tracks 1, 3, 5 and 8

Production
 Nocturno Culto – mixing, engineering
 Jack Control – mastering
 Matthew Vickerstaff – design, illustration
 Fenriz – art direction

Charts

References

External links
 

Darkthrone albums
2016 albums
Peaceville Records albums